Michael P. "Buzz" Donnelly (born March 25, 1967) is a United States Navy rear admiral and naval flight officer who serves as the commander of Carrier Strike Group 5 and Task Force 70 since October 21, 2021. He most recently served as the 37th commander of the United States Naval Forces Korea, concurrently serving as Commander, Navy Region Korea, Commander, Task Force 78, Commander, Naval Component, United States Forces Korea and United Nations Command from April 25, 2019 to September 29, 2021. As CNFK/CNRK, Donnelly was responsible to the Commander, Navy Installations Command, Commander, U.S. Seventh Fleet and Commander, U.S. Pacific Fleet for the administration and command of land-based naval forces on the Korean peninsula, including the sole American navy installation, Fleet Activities Chinhae. His present rank became effective on May 1, 2019.

He was promoted to captain effective February 1, 2011.

In February 2023, he was nominated for promotion to rear admiral and assignment as director of the Air Warfare Division in the Office of the Chief of Naval Operations.

References

1967 births
Living people
Place of birth missing (living people)
People from Maryland
Villanova University alumni
Military personnel from Maryland
United States Naval Flight Officers
Recipients of the Air Medal
Naval War College alumni
Recipients of the Legion of Merit
United States Navy rear admirals (lower half)